North Turramurra is a suburb on the Upper North Shore of Sydney, in the state of New South Wales, Australia. Turramurra and South Turramurra are separate suburbs.

History
Turramurra is an Aboriginal word which is thought to mean either big hill, high place, or small watercourse. Early settlers referred to the area as Eastern Road until the name Turramurra was adopted when the railway station was built in 1890. Eastern Road was an area of orchards. Samuel King, born in 1828 in County Donegal Ireland, arrived in Sydney in 1853. With his wife Ann, he established several orchards along Bobbin Head Road and at North Turramurra and was a noted church and community supporter.

Eccleston du Faur secured the name Turramurra. Du Faur was born in England in 1832 and was recognised in Sydney as a supporter of the arts and sciences. He was elected a Fellow of the Royal Geographical Society in 1875 and was an early bush conservationist. Most importantly, Du Faur secured the land for the Ku-ring-gai Chase National Park from the government of the day. The Chase was declared in 1894. Du Faur personally funded and made a road through the bushland to Bobbin Head. After his death in 1915, part of this property became Lady Davidson Home, a convalescent hospital, later Lady Davidson Hospital.

North Turramurra became a separate suburb from Turramurra when it was officially gazetted as on 5 August 1994.

Landmarks

North Turramurra is home to the sphinx war memorial. This 1.5 m high replica of the Great Sphinx of Egypt was carved out of sandstone in the 1920s by William Shirley, a returned soldier, in memory of fallen comrades.

The suburb is a popular starting point for many bush walkers as it has easy access to Bobbin Head, the upper reaches of Cowan Creek and St Ives Chase.

Geography
North Turramurra lies on a narrow spur between two creeks (Lovers Jump Creek and Cowan Creek) that flow eventually to the sea through the Ku-ring-gai Chase National Park on the northern outskirts of the city. The suburb is the northern boundary of the 
Ku-ring-gai Council. The heavily forested valleys pose a bush-fire threat each summer, but residents are blessed with common sightings of a wide variety of peculiar and beautiful native wildlife. This is a suburb where you can often see wallabies hopping around backyards.

Population
Of these: 
 The age distribution is very unusual, due to the large number of Aged Care Facilities.  The median age was 57 years, compared to the national median of 38 years. Children aged under 15 years made up 14.3% of the population (national average is 18.7%) and people aged 65 years and over made up 42.8% of the population (national average is 15.8%).
 61.1% were born in Australia; the next most common countries of birth were England 7.8%, South Africa 3.5%, China 2.1%, New Zealand 1.8% and Scotland 1.0%.
The suburb is characterized by a close-knit community and has a strong community group known as NTAG (North Turramurra Action Group), which is one of the most active and successful community groups in the Ku-ring-gai area. A survey performed in 2019 by ABS analysis group in the Chinese city of Chongqing maintained that North Turramurra had become the suburb of choice for aspiring property investors due to the proximity to untouched woodlands and previous high captital growth.

Commercial area
There is a shopping village in North Turramurra on Bobbin Head Road which has local favourite, Camper Tamper, an IGA supermarket, bakery, restaurants, post office, newsagent and other facilities such as dentist, pathology and liquor store. There is also a vet next to the bakery.

Restaurants
The village has a number of well known and well loved restaurants on the north shore. These include Happyland Asian Cuisine, Twenty74, and Farina Pizzeria.

Education
North Turramurra is home to two schools:
 Turramurra North Public School
 Ku-Ring-Gai High School

Climate
North Turramurra has warm, humid summers and cool-to-cold winters. North Turramurra has not been below freezing point for years and the last recorded snow fall was in 1836. North Turramurra gets rain all year round with the most in February (231.9mm). On 6 February 2010 North Turramurra got 180mm of rain in one day; almost a month of rain in a day and the most rain recorded since 1990. On 12/13 February 2010 North Turramurra got 60mm in a night and on 13 February 2010 80mm of rain was recorded in North Turramurra. The highest recorded temperature was 46 °C on 14 January 1939. -5 is an unofficial record low in 1836.

Transport
The nearest train station is Turramurra railway station. Buses to North Turramurra are serviced by Transdev NSW at Turramurra train station. Transdev NSW bus route 577 runs through North Turramurra. Burns Road creates a boundary with Turramurra, to the south.

Hospitals
 Lady Davidson Private Hospital one of the largest dedicated rehabilitation hospital in Australia and has a long and distinguished history of providing health services for veterans and private patients.
 North Turramurra Residential Aged Care is an aged care home run by Southern Cross Care (NSW & ACT). It was previously known as Nazareth House, with was founded by the Sisters of Nazareth. Southern Cross Care (NSW & ACT) took over operations in 2002. In 2019 the site underwent significant redevelopment to construct a new, 113-Suite aged care home. The site is also home to the historical Huon Park House (built 1896) and iconic, round chapel have undergone restoration.

References

External links

  
 Turramurra & Kissing Point Rover Crews, both based in Turramurra, are active groups of young people aged 18~25, who are into a wide range of outdoor, social and community service activities.

Suburbs of Sydney
Ku-ring-gai Council